The stock dove (Columba oenas) is a species of bird in the family Columbidae, the doves and pigeons. It is widely distributed in the western Palearctic.

Taxonomy
The stock dove was first formally described by the Swedish naturalist Carl Linnaeus in 1758 in the tenth edition of his Systema Naturae. He placed it with all the other pigeons in the genus Columba and coined the binomial name Columba oenas. The specific name oenas is from the Ancient Greek oinas meaning "pigeon".

Two subspecies are recognised:

 C. o. oenas Linnaeus, 1758 – western Europe and Northwest Africa to northern Kazakhstan, southwestern Siberia and northern Iran
 C. o. yarkandensis Buturlin, 1908 – southeastern Kazakhstan and Uzbekistan to western China

Description
The genus Columba is in the pigeon family, and has the widest distribution. Its members are typically pale grey or brown, often with white head or neck markings or iridescent green or purple patches on the neck and breast. The neck feathers may be stiffened and aligned to form grooves, but these are absent in this species. The stock dove is less grey in plumage than other pigeons in Europe.

The three western European Columba pigeons, though alike, have very distinctive characteristics.  The common wood pigeon may be readily distinguished by its large size, as well as the white on its neck (in adults) and wings. The rock dove and stock dove are more alike in size and plumage, but wild specimens of the former have a white rump and two well-marked dark bars on the wing, while the rump of the stock dove is grey and its wing bars incomplete. The feral pigeon (the same species as the rock dove) is highly variable, and indistinctly marked grey specimens with the white rump missing can sometimes resemble the stock dove quite closely.

The stock dove is sociable as well as gregarious, often consorting with wood pigeons, though doubtless it is the presence of food which brings them together.

The short, deep, "grunting" Ooo-uu-ooh call is quite distinct from the modulated cooing notes of the common wood pigeon; it is loud enough to be described, somewhat fancifully, as "roaring".

Ecology
The stock dove is the scarcest of the wild European pigeons, though still common in ideal habitat. In part of its European and western Asiatic range it is a migrant. There has been a sharp decline in France (−57% in 1976). Although the species is not considered threatened in Europe, it is classified in Schedule 2 of the Birds Directive and Annex III the Berne Convention. 100,000 to 200,000 individuals winter in France. Over half of the European stock dove population is found in the UK.

The nest is usually in a hole in an old tree. Before deforestation, the stock dove was the most frequent pigeon, nesting mostly in oak or pine wood, but as it usually nests in cavities in trees it was normally only found in old forests. In plantations there are not as many holes to nest in, so it is scarcer. In addition, as the stock dove is double-brooded, requiring two holes for its broods. It has been observed nesting in rabbit burrows, ruins, old poplar hedges, cracks in crags or cliff faces, in ivy, and in the thick growth around the boles of lime trees. It will also use nest boxes. The cavity should be about 75 centimetres deep and the hole should be big enough to admit a fist. Though nesting material is seldom used, the squabs leave the hole very oily. Stock doves prefer to nest close together. Outside of the breeding season, stock doves may also roost in cavities.

The habitat of the stock dove is generally open country. Even though it nests in trees it does not prefer densely wooded areas. It is also common on coasts where the cliffs provide holes.

Its flight is quick, performed by regular beats, with an occasional sharp flick of the wings, a characteristic of pigeons in general. It perches well, and in nuptial display walks along a horizontal branch with swelled neck, lowered wings, and fanned tail. During the circling spring flight the wings are smartly cracked like a whip.

Most of its food is plant material; young shoots and seedlings are favoured, and it will take grain as well as insects and snails. In some areas it feeds mostly on acorns and pine seeds. Its diet can include a variety of foods: berries such as bay and hawthorn, figs, cereal grains, beans, peas, and small invertebrates that are obtained while walking on the ground. During autumn migration in October, stock doves stop over at places with an abundance of acorns, supplementing the diet with shoots and leaves.

Etymology
The common name stock dove has caused some confusion about the origins of this bird. The modern usage of the word "stock" might imply that the bird has been tamed and kept as stock for food and merchandise, leading to the belief that this bird is a hybrid breed with its origins in human aviaries; however, this is not the case. The word "stock" in the common name of this species refers not to the stock of trade, but comes from the Old English "stocc" meaning "stump, post, stake, tree trunk, log,". Therefore, "stock dove" means roughly "a dove which lives in hollow trees". Such hollow trees near human settlements would often be taken and used as wood stock for firewood, hence the name.

The genus name Columba is the Latin word meaning "pigeon, dove", whose older etymology comes from the Ancient Greek κόλυμβος (kolumbos), "a diver", from κολυμβάω (kolumbao), "dive, plunge headlong, swim". Aristophanes (Birds, 304) and others use the word κολυμβίς (kolumbis), "diver", for the name of the bird, because of its swimming motion in the air.

References

Further reading

External links

 Ageing and sexing (PDF; 4.2 MB) by Javier Blasco-Zumeta & Gerd-Michael Heinze

stock dove
Birds of Europe
Birds of Central Asia
stock dove
stock dove